The Gobabis Reformed Church is the oldest congregation of the Reformed Churches in South Africa (GKSA) in Gobabis in eastern Namibia. At the end of 2015, according to a poll of 300, it was the second-largest traditional Reformed Church congregation in the country.

Background 
The Gobabis Reformed Church was born of the migration of around 2,000 Angola-Afrikaners, descendants of the Dorsland Trek emigrants of the 1880s who mostly adhered to the GKSA and mostly returned to South West Africa (SWA) in 1929. From the establishment at the end of the nineteenth century of the Mariental Reformed Church (NGK) (as Gibeon, 1898) until 1930, the church council counted at most five congregations in SWA, all affiliated with the Dutch Reformed Church in South Africa (NGK). In 1930, three GKSA churches formed in rapid succession, including those in Gobabis, Outjo, and Aranos. The minority of Angola-Afrikaners in the Dutch Reformed Church in South Africa (NHK) started their first three congregations in South West Africa in similar fashion in 1937: Gobabis (July 31), Otjiwarongo (August 21), and Grootfontein (September 4). The NGK did not arrive until after both of these foundations.

Foundation 
In Kerk in 'n beter land: Die Kerkverhaal van die Dorsland- en Angolatrekkers 1873–1937, J.M. van Tonder (ed.) writes as follows about the Afrikaners' role in the founding of the settlement: "The Particular Synod of the Cape Reformed Church had, on May 26, 1930, delegated the Rev. H.S. van Jaarsveld to seek out members from Angola and South Africa and organize a church to guide them in the Word and the Sacrament. The Rev. Van Jaarsveld met with the elders Sarel du Plessis and E.T. Meyer and traveled to Farm 412, where a large group of parishioners awaited." Prof. Dr. Jooste write in his Gedenkboek van die Dorstandtrek:

During the first week of June, the Rev. Van Jaarsveld concentrated on testimonial catechism. On Saturday, June 6, 1930 (actually the next day), the Gobabis congregation was founded (on the Auheib farm). The Rev. Van Jaarseveld blessed the inauguration with the words of Ephesians 2:19-22: 'Consequently, you are no longer foreigners and strangers, but fellow citizens with God's people and also members of his household, built on the foundation of the apostles and prophets, with Christ Jesus himself as the chief cornerstone. In him the whole building is joined together and rises to become a holy temple in the Lord. And in him you too are being built together to become a dwelling in which God lives by his Spirit.' On June 6, 1930, all the church councilors of Angola gathered to approve the new congregation. An emotional moment arose when the last minutes from a meeting in Humpata, Angola, were read, approved, and signed by the council. Grounds acquisition was discussed, and the Humpata church council agreed to stay active until the foundation. A letter would also be sent to GKSA members in Ghanzi, Botswana, to which Gobabis would be the nearest GKSA congregation. On Saturday, June 7, 1930 (the Gobabis congregation's foundation date), the Reformed Church members gathered at Helew 408 farm, near the house of P.C. Akkerman, to pitch the tent. There were 364 confirmed and 462 baptized members, altogether 826, in the new Gobabis S.W.A. Reformed Church. The Rev. Van Jaarsveld, the chairman, explained to the congregation that the existing Angola church council had been dissolved and a new one needed to be elected, which it then was by secret ballot. The new councilors would be confirmed during the dedication service. As in Angola, a cattle fund was established to which people were expected to contribute to the best of their ability.

The remains of the farm church still stand. In 1990, the members gathered there to commemorate the church's founding. The Helma farmhouse was partly built from the limestone cobblestones of the church.

Church building 
The new congregation immediately set about acquiring church lands in the Gobabis area after leaving Portuguese Angola. The municipal government assured the church council that suitable lands would not be used for an airport (it is unclear why the church council would be concerned about such a possibility). Many factors contributed to the two-decade delay in construction, among them World War II.

Finally, the renowned architect Gerard Moerdyk was hired to design the church, with P.J. van der Merwe hired as secretary of the building commission. Smit and Wagner was the firm contracted. Moerdyk suggested the same plan he had used for the Potchefstroom-Noord Reformed Church (later named the Potchefstroom-Die Bult Reformed Church), although the Potchefstroom building had different towers and was built entirely of brick. Moerdyk's blueprint included a Greek cross for the tower and seating for 400 churchgoers. The gallery, with seating for 125 people, symbolized outstretched arms embracing the community of believers. The tower was given a blunt point, since a pointed spire was considered too similar to a Roman Catholic church.

Moerdyk proposed a cheaper wood for roofing; the floor was also not to be parqueted at first. The pews came later from Johannesburg, and the municipal government installed the lighting. The pulpit was made locally and acoustic plaster was omitted to save money. A member, J.C. Labuschagne, gifted the church bell.

Construction began in April 1949, and the keystone was laid July 29, 1950. A member, Sannie Jansen van Vuuren, placed a bottle with a time capsule of documents under the keystone. On August 25, 1952, the congregation moved into the church it had been seeking since 1930. Elder P. Potgieter unlocked the door, elder H.P. du Plessis placed the Holy Bible on the lectern, and elder M. Van der Merwe placed the Psalter by its side.

Van Vuuren was born September 14, 1867, as Susanna Catherina du Plessis in Grivelfontein, near Rustenburg, and died on July 7, 1952. Her father, Lourens Marthinus du Plessis, led the second Dorsland Trek. On September 27, 1885, she had married Christoffel Johannes Janse van Vuuren (22 December 1866 – 1 December 1938) in Grootfontein. He had been born in Leeuwfontein, near Potchefstroom, and died on the Haring farm, near Gobabis. 12 children were born to this marriage. As the oldest member of the congregation, she was a natural choice to lay the aforementioned bottle with information on the congregation under its keystone.

Gobabis had 305 confirmed members at the end of 1997, 274 at the end of 2001, and 211 at the end of 2012, but had rebounded to 242 at the end of 2014. The general trend of GKSA congregations in Namibia in the first decade and a half of the 21st century was stable, except for major declines in Aranos, the Grootfontein, and the Karasburg

Pastors 
 Kruger, Herculaas Frederik Venter, 1931–1935 (together with Outjo and Omrah)
 Van der Merwe, Johannes Lodewikus, 1939–1944 (together)
 Botha, Louis Jacobus, 1946–1949
 Van Rooy, Jacobus, 1950–1957
 Labuschagne, Frans Jakob, 1958–1966
 De Bruyn, dr. Frans Roelof Petrus, 1967–1969
 De Klerk, dr. Barend Jacobus, 1970–1975
 Vorster, dr. Jacobus Marthinus, 1975–1978
 Van der Schyff, Jan Adriaan Venter, 1978–1981 (left the ministry)
 Du Plessis, Roelof Jacobus Petrus, 1982–2007 (accepted his emeritus)
 Grönum, dr. Nicolaas Johannes, 2002–2004
 De Bruyn, Paul Jacobus, 2007–2011
 Kotzee, Dirk, 2012–2015
 Van den Heever, Werner, 2016 – present (accepted from the Vryheid Reformed Church)

Missionaries 
 Kruger, dr. Mechiel Andries, 1963–1966 (among the San people)
 Van der Westhuizen, Philippus Jacobus Wilhelmus Schutte, 1967–1978
 Van der Walt, Nicolaas Jakobus, 1978–1982
 Venter, Tjaard Machiel, 1982–1985
 Viljoen, dr. Francois Petrus, 1988–1990
 Vogel, Gert Marthinus, 1991–1997

Sources 
 (af) Harris, C.T., Noëth, J.G., Sarkady, N.G., Schutte, F.M. and Van Tonder, J.M. 2010. Van seringboom tot kerkgebou: die argitektoniese erfenis van die Gereformeerde Kerke. Potchefstroom: Administratiewe Buro.
 (af) Schalekamp, Rev. M.E. (chairman: editing committee). 2001. Die Almanak van die Gereformeerde Kerke in Suid-Afrika vir die jaar 2002. Potchefstroom: Administratiewe Buro.
 (af) Van der Walt, Dr. S.J. (chairman: almanac deputies). 1997. Die Almanak van die Gereformeerde Kerke in Suid-Afrika vir die jaar 1998. Potchefstroom: Administratiewe Buro.
 (af) Ammi Venter (chief ed.) 1957. Almanak van die Gereformeerde Kerk in Suid-Afrika vir die jaar 1958. Potchefstroom: Administratiewe Buro.
 (af) Venter, Rev. A.A. (chief ed.) 1958. Almanak van die Gereformeerde Kerk in Suid-Afrika vir die jaar 1959. Potchefstroom: Administratiewe Buro.
 (af) Vogel, Willem (ed.). 2014. Die Almanak van die Gereformeerde Kerke in Suid-Afrika vir die jaar 2015. Potchefstroom: Administratiewe Buro.
 (af) Vogel, Willem (red.). 2015. Die Almanak van die Gereformeerde Kerke in Suid-Afrika vir die jaar 2016. Potchefstroom: Administratiewe Buro.

See also 
 Reformed Churches in Namibia

External links 
 (af) Congregation website URL accessed 2 December 2015.
 (af) Predikantspaar in Botswana gekaap, beroof, Republikein, 3 April 2017. URL accessed 3 April 2017.

Afrikaner culture in Namibia
Angolan diaspora
Omaheke Region
Churches in Namibia
1930 establishments in South West Africa
Christian organizations established in 1930
Protestantism in Namibia
Reformed Churches in South Africa